Stylopidae is a family of twisted-winged insects in the order Strepsiptera. There are about 15 genera and more than 330 described species in Stylopidae.

Members of Stylopidae are parasitic insects. Host insects of this family that are afflicted are referred to as being "stylopized".

Stylopidae are associated primarily with wasps and bees but are known to also use members of Blattodea, Mantodea, Orthoptera, Hemiptera, Diptera, and other Hymenoptera as hosts. Stylopized hosts often display a variety of physical and behavioral changes.

Life cycle 
As with others in the order Strepsiptera, Stylopidae larvae called triungulins enter their host and develop inside it. Females will remain inside the host. When females are ready to breed, they will push their head and brood canal opening, which is located just behind their head, out between the host insect's sclerites. Females draw males with pheromones who mate with them by means of the exposed brood canal. The eggs will hatch inside of their mother, and the larvae will feed on her body until it is time for them to exit through the brood canal and find their own hosts.

Genera
Crawfordia Pierce, 1908    
Eurystylops Bohart, 1943    
Halictoxenos Pierce, 1908    
Hylecthrus Saunders, 1850    
Melittostylops Kinzelbach, 1971    
Pseudoxenos Saunders, 1872    
Stylops Kirby, 1802    
Xenos Rossi, 1793
†Jantarostylops Kulicka, 2001 (Baltic amber, Priabonian)

References

Strepsiptera
Insect families
Taxa named by William Kirby (entomologist)

Parasitic insects